Personal File is the 92nd album by American music icon Johnny Cash. The two CD set was released posthumously on May 23, 2006, by Legacy Recordings. Personal File contains 49 unreleased tracks on two CDs recorded between 1973 and 1982. Given that all tracks on the album were previously unreleased, Personal File is considered both a posthumous album and a compilation. Recovered from a vault of material housed at the House of Cash studios, Personal File includes "Tin Pan Alley hits, traditional folk and gospel tunes, new originals and favorite covers"  – by Carter Family, Louvin Brothers, Johnny Horton, John Prine, Rodney Crowell, and Carlene Carter. The album was compiled and produced by Gregg Geller with liner notes by Greil Marcus. On most of the tracks, Cash performs alone, accompanying himself on guitar, and on many tracks Cash prefaces the song with remarks about its history and what it means to him.

In 2007, Legacy released a sequel, More Songs from Johnny's Personal File, featuring additional private recordings. The first album was reissued in 2011 by Legacy under the revised title Bootleg Vol. 1: Personal File, which was followed by three more volumes of unreleased or rare recordings. (As of 2015, however, More Songs from Johnny's Personal File has yet to be reissued under this brand.)

Track listing

Personnel
 Johnny Cash - Vocals, Guitar, Producer

Additional personnel
 Vic Anesini – Mastering
 Charlie Bragg – Engineer
 John Carter Cash – Executive Producer
 Gregg Geller – Producer, Compilation
 John Jackson – Project Director
 Greil Marcus – Liner Notes
 Jim Marshall – Photography, Cover Photo
 Randall Martin – Art Direction, Design
 Rosa Menkes – Producer
 Lou Robin – Executive Producer

Chart performance

Reviews
 "Johnny Cash Treasure Chest on the Way" - CMT
 "Johnny Cash's Vault Opens" - Rolling Stone
 "Johnny Cash Gets Personal" - Spin

References

External links
 Johnny Cash's Official Website
 Record Label

2006 compilation albums
Johnny Cash compilation albums
Columbia Records compilation albums